Toyota Battery Manufacturing North Carolina (TBMNC) is a manufacturing plant under construction near Greensboro, North Carolina that will focus on building battery packs for electric vehicles. The company will be a subsidiary of Toyota Motor North America, itself a subsidiary of Toyota Motor Corporation of Japan. The company will also have a 10 percent investment from Toyota Tsusho America, another member of the Toyota Group, focused on producing raw materials.

When the plant opens in 2025, it will employ 1,750 people on four production lines, each capable of making battery packs for 200,000 vehicles annually, for a combined total of up to 800,000 vehicles per year. The automaker says the plant will be built to support the addition of up to two additional production lines in the future.

Toyota announced the plant on December 6, 2021, with groundbreaking expected to take place in mid-2022.

The plant will cost Toyota  to build, with the company officials saying they selected North Carolina for the new plant based on the availability of renewable energy from Duke Energy. Toyota plans for the plant to be powered completely by renewable energy.

References 

Toyota factories
Motor vehicle assembly plants in North Carolina
Companies based in Greensboro, North Carolina
Industrial buildings completed in the 21st century
Electric vehicle battery manufacturers